= Alternatives: Turkish Journal of International Relations =

- Discipline: International relations
- Language: English

Publication details
- History: 2002–2015
- Publisher: Yalova University

Standard abbreviations
- ISO 4: Altern.: Turk. J. Int. Relat.

Indexing
- ISSN: 2146-0809 (print); 1303-5525 (web)

Links
- Journal homepage

Alternatives: Turkish Journal of International Relations is an open access peer-reviewed academic journal covering international relations and political science.
